The Forgotten One is a 1989 American supernatural thriller film starring Kristy McNichol and Terry O'Quinn.

Plot
A writer who is recently widowed moves into a Victorian house that may be haunted. The writer is attracted to his beautiful new neighbor, yet finds himself being seduced by the spirit of a woman murdered in his house one hundred years ago.

Cast
 Terry O'Quinn as Bob Anderson
 Kristy McNichol as Barbara Stupple
  Blair Parker  as Evelyn James
 Elisabeth Brooks as Carla
  Michael K. Osborn  as Dillon  
  Ed Battle  as Bum
  Dwayne Carrington  as Realtor

References

External links

  
 

1980s supernatural thriller films
1989 films
1989 horror films
American supernatural thriller films
1980s supernatural horror films
1980s English-language films
1980s American films